Love is Forever is a 1954 West German drama film directed by Wolfgang Liebeneiner and starring Karlheinz Böhm, Ulla Jacobsson and Ingrid Andree. The film is based on the play Fires of St. John by Hermann Sudermann.

It was shot at the Tempelhof Studios in Berlin. The film's art direction was by Willi Herrmann and Heinrich Weidemann. It was shot using Agfacolor.

Cast
 Karlheinz Böhm as Georg
 Ulla Jacobsson as Marieke
 Ingrid Andree as Trude Vogelreuther
 Magda Schneider as Mrs. Vogelreuther
 Paul Dahlke as Mr. Vogelreuther
 Günther Lüders as Ploetz
 Lucie Englisch
 Karola Ebeling as Erna
 Erich Ponto
 Hans Quest as Hasske
 Jakob Tiedtke as The Priest
 Nina von Porembsky as Lina
 Hilde von Stolz
 Horst Winter

References

Bibliography 
 Williams, Alan. Film and Nationalism. Rutgers University Press, 2002.

External links 
 

1954 films
1954 drama films
German drama films
West German films
1950s German-language films
Films based on works by Hermann Sudermann
Films directed by Wolfgang Liebeneiner
Remakes of German films
Constantin Film films
Films shot at Tempelhof Studios
1950s German films